Raimundus Li Quanzhen was layman and a devout Christian in the apostolic vicariate of Southeastern Zhili in China nowadays Roman Catholic Diocese of Xianxian. He is one of the first Christian martyrs during boxer rebellion. He is one of the Martyr Saints of China.

Life 
Li was born in 1841 at Chentuncun, Jiaohe, Hebei, China.

Martyrdom 
On 30 June 1900, Li was beaten to death in Chentuncun, Jiaohe, Hebei, China.

Canonization 
Li was venerated on 22 February 1955 by Pope Pius XII as a martyr and beatified on 17 April 1955 by Pope Pius XII. He was canonized by Pope John Paul II on 1 October 2000 along with Mark Ji Tianxiang.

References 

1841 births
Christian martyrs
Catholic saints
1900 deaths
Chinese saints
Canonizations by Pope John Paul II